Niklas Henrikki Tarvajärvi (born 13 March 1983) is a retired Finnish professional footballer who played as a striker.

Career

Jokerit
Tarvajärvi started his career at FC Jokerit in Finland's Veikkausliiga. During the seasons 2001–2004 he represented the team in 39 matches and scored 11 goals.

MyPa
After FC Jokerit was sold to rivals HJK Helsinki in March 2004 and renamed to Klubi-04 Tarvajarvi transferred to MyPa. In the next two seasons he made 37 appearances and 3 goals.

Heerenveen
In the summer of 2005 he moved to Heerenveen. Between 2005 and 2009 he gained 30 appearances in the team and scored four goals. He also spent time on loan in De Graafschap and Vitesse Arnhem.

Neuchâtel Xamax
After almost four years in the Netherlands, Tarvajarvi joined Neuchâtel Xamax in February 2009.

Karlsruher SC
He then signed on 21 July 2009 a two-year contract with Karlsruher SC.

Go Ahead Eagles
After his contract in Karlsruher SC ended he transferred to Dutch Eerste Divisie side Go Ahead Eagles.

RoPS
In April 2013 it was reported that Tarvajärvi had signed a contract with Veikkausliiga team RoPS. He decided to leave the team after only 10 appearances.

International career
Tarvajärvi debuted in the Finland national team on 12 March 2005, coming on as a substitute against Kuwait in a friendly match.

Honours

Club
MyPa
Veikkausliiga: 2005
Finnish Cup: 2004

Career statistics

International

References

External links

  
 
 
 

1983 births
Living people
People from Tuusula
Association football forwards
Finnish footballers
Finland international footballers
FC Jokerit players
Myllykosken Pallo −47 players
SC Heerenveen players
De Graafschap players
SBV Vitesse players
Neuchâtel Xamax FCS players
Karlsruher SC players
Go Ahead Eagles players
Veikkausliiga players
Eredivisie players
Eerste Divisie players
Swiss Super League players
2. Bundesliga players
Finnish expatriate footballers
Expatriate footballers in the Netherlands
Finnish expatriate sportspeople in the Netherlands
Expatriate footballers in Switzerland
Finnish expatriate sportspeople in Switzerland
Expatriate footballers in Germany
Finnish expatriate sportspeople in Germany
Sportspeople from Uusimaa